is a 1957 black-and-white Japanese film directed by Mitsuo Hirotsu (弘津三男).

Cast 
 Raizo Ichikawa
 Michiko Saga
 Narutoshi Hayashi
 Tamao Nakamura

References

External links 
  http://www.raizofan.net/link4/movie2/onibi.htm

Japanese black-and-white films
1957 films
Films directed by Mitsuo Hirotsu
Daiei Film films
1950s Japanese films